The following is a list of the Lithuania national football team's competitive records and statistics.

Individual records

Player records 

Players in bold are still active, at least at club level.

Most capped players

Top goalscorers

Manager records

Team records

Competition records

FIFA World Cup

UEFA European Championship

UEFA Nations League

*Draws include knockout matches decided via penalty shoot-out.
**Group stage played home and away. Flag shown represents host nation for the finals stage.

Head-to-head record 
This list attempts to list every official and friendly game played by the Lithuania national football team since 1990. Although it has played a number of countries around the world, some repeatedly, Lithuania has played the most games (19) against neighbouring Latvia.

Notes

References

Lithuania national football team
National association football team records and statistics